Nuno Miguel Delgado ComIH (born 27 August 1976) is a former Portuguese judoka who became known for winning Portugal's first Olympic medal in judo – a bronze in the under-81 kg category at the 2000 Summer Olympics, in Sydney, Australia. He was also senior European champion (Bratislava, 1999).

Personal life
Born in Portugal, Delgado is of Cape Verdean descent.

References

External links
 Official website
 
 
 Podcast Interview with Nuno Delgado on TheJudoPodcast.eu

1976 births
Living people
Portuguese male judoka
Olympic judoka of Portugal
Olympic bronze medalists for Portugal
Olympic medalists in judo
Judoka at the 2000 Summer Olympics
Judoka at the 2004 Summer Olympics
Medalists at the 2000 Summer Olympics
Black Portuguese sportspeople
Portuguese people of Cape Verdean descent
20th-century Portuguese people
21st-century Portuguese people